John Towill coached and choreographed national and international champions in dance, freestyle, pairs, and synchronized ice skating. He is a member of the National Ice Skating Association, U.S. Figure Skating, PSA, and the Ice Skating Institute. He was a member of the Great Britain International Team and a Great Britain Professional Champion. Towill was the head coach of the Precisely Right synchronized skating team from Mennen Arena in Morris Plains, New Jersey, United States.

References

External links
Precisely Right Coaches Information.
Skating Club of Morris Pro Board
Synchronized Skating Article

British figure skating coaches
Living people
Year of birth missing (living people)